The 1963 French Championships (now known as the French Open) was a tennis tournament that took place on the outdoor clay courts at the Stade Roland-Garros in Paris, France. The tournament ran from 13 May until 26 May. It was the 67th staging of the French Championships, and the second Grand Slam tennis event of 1963. Roy Emerson and Lesley Turner won the singles titles.

Finals

Men's singles

 Roy Emerson defeated  Pierre Darmon 3–6, 6–1, 6–4, 6–4

Women's singles

 Lesley Turner defeated  Ann Jones 2–6, 6–3, 7–5

Men's doubles

 Roy Emerson /   Manuel Santana defeated  Gordon Forbes /  Abe Segal  6–2, 6–4, 6–4

Women's doubles

 Ann Jones /  Renée Schuurman defeated  Robyn Ebbern / Margaret Smith 7–5, 6–4

Mixed doubles

 Margaret Smith /  Ken Fletcher defeated  Lesley Turner /  Fred Stolle 6–1, 6–2

References

External links
 French Open official website

French Championships
French Championships (tennis) by year
French Championships (tennis)
French Championships (tennis)
French Championships (tennis)